Bill Malone (born July 22, 1958) is an American entertainer/magician/actor who specializes in card magic, close-up magic and corporate events.

Malone was raised in Chicago, Illinois and became interested in magic at the age of 17. He is a recipient of the Merlin Award from the International Magicians Society. He appeared on many network specials including, the first World's Greatest Magic Special, World's Wildest Magic Special, as well as Champions of Magic Special.

Malone moved to Fort Lauderdale, Florida where he owned and operated a comedy magic club called Houdini's Pub. He was partners with Wayne Huizenga at the Boca Raton Resort where they created  Malone's Magic Bar.

Malone is best known for his presentations for several Fortune 500 companies.

Publications 

On the Loose, a four-volume instructional DVD set of close-up magic
Here I Go Again, a three volume instructional DVD set of card magic
Malone Meets Marlo, a six-volume instructional DVD set of material from Malone's mentor Ed Marlo

References

External links 

Bill Malone on MagicPedia

American magicians
Living people
1958 births